Sufetula carbonalis is a moth species in the family Crambidae. It was described by James E. Hayden in 2013. It is found in North America, where it has been recorded from Florida.

The length of the forewings is 3.5–5 mm. The forewings are grey to dark grey. The antemedial and postmedial lines are white, edged with dark grey. Sometimes, a white basal line is visible. The discal spot is blackish and there are two white spots on the costa. The hindwings are grey to dark grey with a dark grey discal spot and a white postmedial line. Adults have been recorded on wing in April, May, July, November and December.

The larvae probably feed on the roots of palm species, possibly including Phoenix roebelenii and Dypsis lutescens.

Etymology
The species name refers to the dark grey maculation and is derived from Latin carbo (meaning charcoal).

References

Moths described in 2013
Spilomelinae
Moths of North America